Faith Episcopal Church is located in Cameron Park, California, United States,  adjacent to U.S. Route 50 in the California Gold Country foothills region. Parishioners come from Sacramento, Folsom, El Dorado Hills and the Placerville area.  The parish is located in a modern church building completed in 2003, housing a congregation that started as a mission group in the home of Father Kent S. McNair. In the spring of 2001 Faith Church became a parish of the Episcopal Diocese of Northern California. Faith Church is one of the younger parishes in the Diocese.

The single church building sitting on roughly 10 acres of land is designed as a multi-functional facility with sanctuary, library, multi-purpose rooms, and administrative offices all in one. The master plan for the  site includes a chapel, a columbarium, a dedicated sanctuary and a Christian education building.

Parish history
On Easter Sunday 1992, Faith Church held its first public service in a storefront building about two miles (3 km) from the current parish location. For almost 11 years, Faith Church grew steadily,  eventually outgrowing its space. In 2003, the parish moved into a newly constructed church building on the current site, on the western edge of Cameron Park, California.

Leadership history 
Founding Rector, Father Kent S. McNair retired in early 2013, and on January 27, 2013, the Bishop Barry Beisner of the Episcopal Diocese of Northern California performed the installation of the second Rector for Faith Church, Reverend Sean Cox, who served as Faith Church's Rector for over 7 years, and left in July 2019.

From July, 2019 and through July, 2020, Faith was served and led by Interim Rector, Pastor Liz Armstrong, and Assistant Rector, Reverend Sonya Reichel. Reverend Sonya works part time and is continuing with the Church as it transitions to a Priest in Charge for 3 years. Pastor Liz Armstrong has entered retirement, as of July 31, 2020. A new Priest in Charge has been chosen as of June, 2020. The priest's name is Reverend Tom Gartin. Reverend Tom started his three years at Faith Church in August, 2020.

See also

Faith Church official website
Episcopal Diocese of Northern California
Episcopal Church of the United States of America
 National Cathedral, Washington, D.C.
Grace Cathedral, San Francisco
Trinity Episcopal Cathedral of Sacramento, California
Church of our Savior Episcopal Church, Placerville, California

References

Episcopal church buildings in California
Churches in El Dorado County, California
2001 establishments in California
Churches completed in 2002
21st-century Episcopal church buildings